The individual dressage at the 2022 FEI World Championships in Herning, Denmark was held from 6 to 14 August.

Great Britain's Charlotte Fry won the gold medal in both Grand Prix Special and Grand Prix Freestyle. Cathrine Laudrup-Dufour representing Denmark won a silver medal in both the Grand Prix Special and the Grand Prix Freestyle. Dinja van Liere of the Netherlands won a bronze in special and the Freestyle.

Competition format

The team and individual dressage competitions used the same results. Dressage had three phases. The first phase was the Grand Prix. Top 30 individuals advanced to the second phase, the Grand Prix Special where the first individual medals were awarded. The last set of medals at the 2022 World Dressage Championships was awarded after the third phase, the Grand Prix Freestyle where top 15 combinations competed.

Results

References

FEI World Equestrian Games
2022 in Danish sport
Equestrian sports competitions in Denmark
International sports competitions hosted by Denmark
FEI World Equestrian Games
Para Dressage